Tuomas Takala (born October 1, 1984) is a Finnish professional ice hockey player. He is currently playing for S-Kiekko of the Finnish Suomi-sarja.

Takala played three season in the SM-liiga with Ässät, registering 7 goals, 7 assists, 14 points, and 72 penalty minutes, in 154 games played between 2005–06 and 2007–08.

References

External links

1984 births
Living people
Ässät players
Finnish ice hockey centres
Kokkolan Hermes players
People from Seinäjoki
Vaasan Sport players
Sportspeople from South Ostrobothnia